Chris Oliver is an American college football coach. He is the head football coach at Georgetown College in Georgetown, Kentucky, a position to which he was hired in December 2021. Oliver was the head football coach at Lindsey Wilson College in Columbia, Kentucky from the inception of the school's football program, which began play in 2010, through the 2021 season. Oliver led the Lindsey Wilson Blue Raiders to the NAIA Football National Championship in the spring of 2021.

Head coaching record

References

External links
 Lindsey Wilson profile

Date of birth missing (living people)
Year of birth missing (living people)
Living people
Georgetown Tigers football coaches
Lindsey Wilson Blue Raiders football coaches
Ohio Dominican Panthers football coaches
Ohio State Buckeyes football coaches
Ohio Dominican University alumni
Ohio State University alumni